Mehmet Topal (born 3 March 1986) is a Turkish former professional footballer who played as a defensive midfielder. He was nicknamed Örümcek (Spider), due to his ability to use his long legs to win loose balls or cut passes.

He spent most of his career with Galatasaray and Fenerbahçe, totalling five major trophies with those clubs. He also had a two-year spell in La Liga with Valencia.

A Turkish international from 2008 to 2018, Topal represented the nation in two European Championships.

Club career

Early years
Born in Malatya, Topal started his football career at local Malatya B.S. at the age of 13. He made his senior debut with lowly Dardanel Spor A.Ş. in the third division.

In September 2006, Topal joined Süper Lig powerhouse Galatasaray SK, moving to the club alongside Japanese Junichi Inamoto.

Galatasaray
Topal appeared in only 11 games in his first season in Istanbul. However, due to an injury to Swedish international Tobias Linderoth, he was handed his chance in the starting XI, later commenting on his teammate: "He helped me a lot, told me about the areas I should improve and how to do so. Sadly, I got my chance through his injury but I want him to recover in the shortest time possible."

In April 2008, Topal extended his contract with Gala for five years, having played 26 matches during the campaign to help the team win the national championship and also reaching the Turkish national team in that timeframe. In the 2008 summer transfer window, there were rumours surrounding a move to Everton in the Premier League, with David Moyes apparently keen to bring the player to Goodison Park.

Topal eventually stayed put, appearing in an average of 22 games in the following seasons but also having to deal with injury early into 2009–10.

Valencia
On 12 May 2010, Topal signed for Valencia CF for a fee believed to be in the region of €5.5 million. On 14 September, he made he first UEFA Champions League appearance with his new club, playing the full 90 minutes against Turkish side Bursaspor in a 4–0 group stage win.

Topal scored his first goal with the Che at Sporting de Gijón, on 25 September 2010 (2–0). In the UEFA Europa League, he netted the game's only goal away against Stoke City on 17 February 2012 in the round of 32 to take his side through 2–0 on aggregate; the 30-yard strike was widely regarded as one of the best goals of that tournament. He played six matches to help his team reach the semi-finals of the latter competition, but overall played second-fiddle to legendary David Albelda during his stint even though the former was ostracised by manager Unai Emery for a period of time.

Fenerbahçe

Topal moved to Fenerbahçe SK on 1 July 2012, for a reported fee of €4.5 million. He signed a four-year contract with a €2 million annually salary, plus bonuses. He contributed 27 appearances and three goals in his second season, as the club won the national championship after a three-year wait.

On 11 August 2015, whilst he drove home after training accompanied by youth player Uygar Mert, Topal's car was shot at by unknown men. He appeared in 11 games in the Europa League round-of-16 run and, precisely at that stage, against S.C. Braga, scored the only goal in the first leg at the Şükrü Saracoğlu Stadium. In the second match, he was sent off for two bookable offences – the second of which resulted in a penalty – as his team had a further two players ejected in an eventual 4–2 aggregate loss.

On 26 June 2019, the 33-year-old Topal left by mutual consent.

Istanbul Başakşehir
On 26 August 2019, Topal joined İstanbul Başakşehir F.K. on a two-year deal, the latter one being optional. After conquering the domestic league at the end of the campaign, he became the first footballer to achieve the feat with three teams.

International career
Topal earned his first cap for Turkey on 6 February 2008, coming on for Emre Belözoğlu in the 78th minute of a 0–0 friendly home draw with Sweden. Shortly after, he was selected by manager Fatih Terim for his UEFA Euro 2008 squad, playing all the games in Austria and Switzerland but one for the eventual semi-finalists.

On 22 May 2016, Topal captained the nation for the first time, in their 1–2 friendly loss to England at the City of Manchester Stadium. A week later, he scored his first international goal on his 58th cap, the only one of a last-minute victory over Montenegro in Antalya. Picked for Euro 2016, he started in all the matches, featuring as a central defender in a 0–3 group stage defeat against Spain.

Career statistics

Club

International

Turkey score listed first, score column indicates score after each Topal goal)

Honours
Galatasaray
Süper Lig: 2007–08
Turkish Super Cup: 2008

Fenerbahçe
Süper Lig: 2013–14
Turkish Cup: 2012–13
Turkish Super Cup: 2014

İstanbul Başakşehir
Süper Lig: 2019–20

Beşiktaş
Turkish Super Cup: 2021

Turkey
UEFA European Championship bronze medal: 2008

References

External links

CiberChe biography and stats 

1986 births
Living people
Sportspeople from Malatya
Turkish footballers
Association football midfielders
Süper Lig players
TFF First League players
Yeni Malatyaspor footballers
Dardanelspor footballers
Galatasaray S.K. footballers
Fenerbahçe S.K. footballers
İstanbul Başakşehir F.K. players
Beşiktaş J.K. footballers
La Liga players
Valencia CF players
Turkey youth international footballers
Turkey under-21 international footballers
Turkey international footballers
UEFA Euro 2008 players
UEFA Euro 2016 players
Turkish expatriate footballers
Expatriate footballers in Spain
Turkish expatriate sportspeople in Spain